HMS Vortigern was a V-class destroyer of the Royal Navy. She served in both World Wars, and was sunk in 1942.

Construction and commissioning
Vortigern was ordered from J. Samuel White, of Cowes, Isle of Wight during the First World War under the 1916–17 Programme Build (9th Order), and was laid down on 17 January 1917. She was launched on 5 October 1917 and commissioned on 21 January 1918. She has been the only ship of the Royal Navy so far to be named HMS Vortigern, after Vortigern, an early British ruler.

Wartime and interwar service
Vortigern served throughout the remaining months of the war, and was redeployed to the Baltic Sea in 1919, later serving with the 1st Destroyer Flotilla.  She was eventually placed in reserve, but was reactivated in 1939 in order to take part in the August Fleet Review of the ships of the reserve by HM King George VI.

Second World War
With the outbreak of war Vortigern was deployed with the 17th Destroyer Flotilla, based at Plymouth and tasked with escorting convoys and carrying out anti-submarine patrols in the South Western Approaches and the English Channel.  She was engaged in these duties for the rest of 1939.  In January 1940 Vortigern was nominated to join the 13th Destroyer Flotilla based at Gibraltar.  On 13 January, she and  escorted the outbound convoy OG 14F to Gibraltar.  On their arrival on 15 January, both destroyers were detached to join the flotilla.  Vortigern spent the period between February and June escorting convoys between Britain and Gibraltar.

On 3 July she was present at the attack on the French fleet at Mers-el-Kébir (Operation Catapult). The operation was abandoned after the force came under heavy air attack, and Vortigern took passage to Britain on 12 July.

She deployed in August on convoy defence duties in Home waters, covering convoys sailing in the North Western Approaches to and from the Clyde.  She was taken in hand in September for a refit, and to be converted into a Short Range Escort. The work lasted until November, and after completing trials Vortigern joined the 12th Destroyer Flotilla based at Rosyth, and deployed to escort convoys in the North Sea.  On 9 December whilst escorting one convoy, Vortigern came under attack by a German seaplane off Aldeburgh.  The destroyer continued her patrols and convoy escort duties all throughout 1941 and into 1942.

Sinking
Vortigern was sunk off Cromer on 15 March 1942, whilst defending a coastal convoy against attack by E-boats.  She was torpedoed by the E-boat S104, and sank with the loss of 110 lives. Only 14 survivors were rescued. Eleven bodies were recovered from the sea by the Cromer lifeboat H F Bailey III. The wrecksite is designated as a Protected Place under the Protection of Military Remains Act 1986. There are twelve war graves in Lowestoft, and one in the New Cromer town cemeteries from HMS Vortigern.

Notes

Bibliography

External links
 
Service history of HMS Vortigern
Vortigern at Uboat.net
SI 2008/0950 Designation under the Protection of Military Remains Act 1986

 

V and W-class destroyers of the Royal Navy
Ships built on the Isle of Wight
1917 ships
World War I destroyers of the United Kingdom
World War II destroyers of the United Kingdom
Protected Wrecks of England
Maritime incidents in March 1942
1942 in England
History of Norfolk